microRNA 21 also known as hsa-mir-21 or miRNA21 is a mammalian microRNA  that is encoded by the MIR21 gene.

MIRN21 was  one of the first mammalian microRNAs identified. The mature miR-21 sequence is strongly conserved throughout evolution. The human microRNA-21 gene is located on plus strand of chromosome 17q23.2 (55273409–55273480) within a coding gene TMEM49 (also called vacuole membrane protein). Despite being located in intronic regions of a coding gene in the direction of transcription, it has its own promoter regions and forms a ~3433-nt long primary transcript of miR-21 (known as pri-miR-21) which is independently transcribed. The stem–loop precursor of miR-21(pre-miR-21) resides between nucleotides 2445 and 2516 of pri-miR-21.

Mature miR-21

Pri-miR-21 is cut by the endonuclease Drosha in the nucleus to produce pre-miR-21, which is exported into the cytosol. This pre-miR-21 is then cut into a short RNA duplex by Dicer in the cytosol. Although abundance of both strands is equal by transcription, only one strand (miR-21) is selected for processing as mature microRNA based on the thermodynamic stability of each end of the duplex, while the other strand (designated with an asterisk; miR-21*) is generally degraded. Mature microRNA is then loaded into microRNA ribonucleoprotein complex RISC (RNA-induced silencing complex) and guided to target mRNAs with near perfect complementarily at 3'UTR.

Targets

A number of targets for microRNA-21 have been experimentally validated and most of them are tumor suppressors, Notable targets include:

 ANP32A, 
 BTG2, 
 Bcl2, 
 P12/CDK2AP1, 
 HNRPK, 
 IL-12p35, 
 JAG1, 
 MEF2C, 
 hMSH2,
 PDCD4, 
 PTEN, 
 RECK, 
 RhoB, 
 SMARCA4, 
 TGFBRII,
 SPRY1,
 SPRY2, 
 TP63, and
 Tropomyosin.

Clinical significance

Cancer 

miR-21 is one of the most frequently upregulated miRNAs in solid tumours, and its high levels were first described in B cell lymphomas. Overall, miR-21 is considered to be a typical 'onco-miR', which acts by inhibiting the expression of phosphatases, which limit the activity of signalling pathways such as AKT and MAPK.
As most of the targets of miR-21 are tumor suppressors, miR-21 is associated with a wide variety of cancers including that of breast, ovaries, cervix, colon, lung,  liver, brain, esophagus, prostate, pancreas, and thyroid.  A 2014 meta-analysis of 36 studies evaluated circulating miR-21 as a biomarker of various carcinomas, finding it has potential as a tool for early diagnosis.  miR-21 expression was associated with survival in 53 triple negative breast cancer patients. miR-21 can also be detected in human faeces from colorectal cancer patients. Additionally, it has been demonstrated as an independent prognostic factor in patients with pancreatic neuroendocrine neoplasms.

Cardiac disease 

miR-21 has been shown to play important role in development of heart disease. It is one of the microRNAs whose expression is increased in failing murine and human hearts. Further, inhibition of microRNAs in mice using chemically modified and cholesterol-conjugated miRNA inhibitors (antagomirs) was shown to inhibit interstitial fibrosis and improve cardiac function in a pressure- overload cardiac disease mice model. Surprisingly, miR-21 global knock-out mice did not show any overt phenotype when compared with wild type mice with respect to cardiac stress response. Similarly, short (8-nt) oligonucleotides designed to inhibit miR-21 could not inhibit cardiac hypertrophy or fibrosis. In another study with a mouse model of acute myocardial infarction, miR-21 expression was found to be significantly lower in infarcted areas and overexpression of miR-21 in those mice via adenovirus-mediated gene transfer decreased myocardial infarct size.
miR-21 has been hypothesized to be an intermediary in the effects of air pollution that lead to endothelial dysfunction and eventually to cardiac disease. Expression of miR-21 is negatively associated with exposure to PM10 air pollution and may mediate its effect on small blood vessels.

References

Further reading

External links 
 
 miRBase miR-21 family MIPF0000060

MicroRNA